Gilberto Crespo y Martínez (17 August 1853 – 7 November 1917) was a Mexican diplomat who served as ambassador of Mexico to the United States (1911–1912) and as Envoy Extraordinary and Minister Plenipotentiary to Cuba (1902–1905) and Austria-Hungary (1906–1911 and 1912–1916).

Works
 (1896).
 (1897).
 (1902).
 (1903).
 (1905).

Notes and references

External links

1853 births
1917 deaths
Ambassadors of Mexico to Cuba
Ambassadors of Mexico to the United States
Ambassadors of Mexico to Austria
Ambassadors of Mexico to Hungary
People from Veracruz (city)
Politicians from Veracruz